Pranvera is an Albanian female given name. It is derived from the Albanian word pranverë 'spring'. 

Persons named Pranvera include:
Pranvera Hoxha, daughter of Enver Hoxha, Albanian architect

References

Albanian feminine given names